Michael Herbert Anderson (11 December 1916 – 10 May 1940) was an English cricketer who played four first-class cricket matches for Cambridge University Cricket Club and Free Foresters. His highest score of 60 came when playing for the Free Foresters in the match against the university side. He also played two Minor Counties Championship matches for Hertfordshire County Cricket Club.

Military career and death
Anderson joined the Royal Air Force in 1936 and was commissioned as a Pilot Officer. He was stationed with No. 600 Squadron RAF at RAF Manston in Kent flying Bristol Blenheim as fighters. On 10 May 1940, Anderson and his air gunner, Leading Aircraftman Herbert Hawkins (but not the navigator), were assigned to a mission to bombard Waalhaven airfield near Rotterdam in the Netherlands. The six Blenheims of B Flight involved in the mission were ambushed whilst returning to base by twelve Messerschmitt Bf 110s near Spijkenisse. Hawkins shot down one of the attacking aircraft, but the attack was too much for the Blenheims. Anderson and Hawkins' aircraft was chased by a single Bf 110, and one of the engines burst due to German fire above Hoogvliet. Forced to attempt a crash landing, Anderson crashed the plane into a field near Hoogvliet. Both Anderson and Hawkins were killed in the landing, Anderson being decapitated. Anderson and Hawkins are buried in Spijkenisse Old General Cemetery.

References

External links

1916 births
1940 deaths
Sportspeople from Devonport, Plymouth
People educated at Clifton College
Alumni of Trinity College, Cambridge
English cricketers
Cambridge University cricketers
Free Foresters cricketers
Hertfordshire cricketers
Royal Air Force officers
Royal Air Force pilots of World War II
British World War II bomber pilots
Royal Air Force personnel killed in World War II
Aviators killed by being shot down
Military personnel from Devonport, Plymouth